General Carrington may refer to:

Frederick Carrington (1844–1913), British Army major general
Harold Carrington (1882–1964), British Army lieutenant general
Henry B. Carrington (1824–1912), Union Army brigadier general